A pyrheliometer is an instrument for measurement of direct beam solar irradiance. Sunlight enters the instrument through a window and is directed onto a thermopile which converts heat to an electrical signal that can be recorded. The signal voltage is converted via a formula to measure watts per square metre.

Standards
Pyrheliometer measurement specifications are subject to International Organization for Standardization (ISO) and World Meteorological Organization (WMO) standards.
Comparisons between pyrheliometers for intercalibration are carried out regularly to measure the amount of solar energy received.
The aim of the International Pyrheliometer Comparisons, which take place every 5 years at the World Radiation Centre in Davos, is to ensure the world-wide transfer of the World Radiometric Reference.
During this event, all participants bring their instruments, solar-tracking and data acquisition systems to Davos to conduct simultaneous solar radiation measurements with the World Standard Group.

Applications
Typical pyrheliometer measurement applications include scientific meteorological and climate observations, material testing research, and assessment of the efficiency of solar collectors and photovoltaic devices.

Usage 
Pyrheliometers are typically mounted on a solar tracker. As the pyrheliometer only 'sees' the solar disk, it needs to be placed on a device that follows the path of the sun.

See also
 Actinometer
 Active cavity radiometer
 Bolometer
 Pyrometer
 Solar constant

References

External link

Measuring instruments
Radiometry
Meteorological instrumentation and equipment